Robert David Hodgson (June 7, 1923 - December 4, 1979) was an American geographer and an internationally recognized expert on geographic aspects of the law of the sea and maritime boundaries. Dr. Hodgson believed that broader understanding of geographic principles would reduce international conflicts. The Hodgson Seamount was named after him.

Works 
 The technical delimitation of a modern equidistant boundary (1975). Self-published.
 
 
 
 The Champlain-Richelieu Lowland: A Study in Historical Geography (dissertation, 1951)

Personal life 
Hodgson was married to Margaret Hodgson. Father to David, Laura, Susan, Peter, Mark, Amy, and Luke.

References

American geographers
1923 births
1979 deaths
20th-century geographers